The 1971–72 Ice hockey Bundesliga season was the 14th season of the Ice hockey Bundesliga, the top level of ice hockey in Germany. Nine teams participated in the league, and Düsseldorfer EG won the championship.

Regular season

References

External links
Season on hockeyarchives.info

Eishockey-Bundesliga seasons
German
Bund